Oplink Communications LLC is a US-based business manufacturing and selling optical components. Oplink's headquarters is located in Fremont, California, and it has facilities in China and Taiwan.

History
The company was founded in San Jose, California in 1995. Oplink moved its manufacturing facility from San Jose to the Zuhai Free Trade Zone in Zhuhai, China in 2000. The company went public (Nasdaq: OPLK) in 2000, with an initial public offering of 13,700,000 shares of its common stock at a price of $18.00 per share. Oplink moved its headquarters to Fremont, California in 2004. Koch Industries acquired Oplink for $445 million in December 2014, and the legal entity changed to Oplink Communications LLC. Oplink is currently owned by Molex, a global electronics components company and Koch Industries subsidiary.

Mergers and acquisitions
Oplink acquired Optical Communication Products, Inc. (Nasdaq: OCPI) for $85.3M in 2007.

Oplink was acquired by Koch Industries for $445M in 2014.

References

External links

Companies based in Fremont, California
Photonics companies
Optics manufacturing companies